Niccolò Pisani (fl.1350–1354) was a Venetian admiral renowned for his victories during the 14th Century War of the Straits between the Republic of Venice and its rival Italian republic, Genoa.

In 1350, when a centuries-long feud between Venice and Genoa erupted again into open war, the Venetian doge, Andrea Dandolo, gave the experienced Pisani command of the city's main fleet. Pisani was dispatched in 1352 to engage the Genoan navy, commanded by his counterpart and rival Paganino Doria, near Constantinople.  There, Pisani won a victory in a brutal battle against the Genoans at the Bosphorus.  However, this victory proved indecisive, as Venetian losses were so great they were unable to continue the assault.  Pisani later inflicted another devastating blow by wiping out a Genoese fleet off Sardinia.

Pisani's distinguished career came to an end when Doria won a crushing victory over him at Porto Longo in 1354.  While Pisani survived and escaped, the defeat would haunt him for the rest of his life.  Only five of the approximately 40 galleys under his command escaped the battle, and Venice itself was only spared by a peace imposed on the two republics by the Duke of Milan.  While the usual punishment for a Venetian admiral responsible for such a disaster would be death, Pisani's previous victories and popularity with the common people of the city earned him some clemency.  However, Pisani was banned from holding future office and sentenced to six months in prison for his role in the catastrophe.

Niccolò's son, Vettor Pisani, was with him at Porto Longo, and would go on to command the Venetian navy more than two decades later in another war with the Genoese.  After several reversals during the campaign, Vettor would play a key role in the ultimate Venetian victory at Chioggia.

References

Year of birth missing
Year of death missing
Republic of Venice admirals
Medieval admirals
People of the Venetian–Genoese wars
14th-century Venetian people
Pisani family